John C. Brown (born June 9, 1939) is a former American football tackle who played ten seasons for two National Football League (NFL) teams, the Cleveland Browns and the Pittsburgh Steelers. He played tackle at Syracuse University alongside Ernie Davis.

Brown played high school football at Camden High School in his hometown. 

In the 2008 movie The Express, Ernie's best friend and roommate is Jack Buckley (Omar Benson Miller), a huge lineman who's called "JB". The character is based on Brown.

References

1939 births
Living people
American football offensive linemen
Cleveland Browns players
Pittsburgh Steelers players
Syracuse Orange football players
Camden High School (New Jersey) alumni
Players of American football from Camden, New Jersey